Line 3 (Linea Tre in Italian, also known as M3) is a subway line serving Milan, Italy. The line is part of the Milan Metro and is operated by ATM. Construction began in 1981 in order to be ready for the 1990 Football World Cup. It is also called the Yellow Line (Linea Gialla) as it is identified by yellow signage.

The line connects the south-eastern suburb of San Donato Milanese to the north-western area of the city passing through the city centre. It is 17.1 km long with 21 stations.

History

The proposal for a third metro line was approved by Milan municipality in 1977. The route was chosen based on a study of main traffic routes in previous years. The final project was presented in early 1981 and works on the new line began on 8 September of the same year. 
The first section, from Centrale to Duomo was opened on 3 May 1990, just before the beginning of the World Cup. However, only a shuttle service was active between the two terminus. The line was extended to Porta Romana at the end of the year.

New extensions to Sondrio on the north and to San Donato on the south opened on 12 May 1991.

Works on the new line slowed during the following years. Zara station was inaugurated only on 16 December 1995 and Maciachini on 8 December 2003. The last extension (Maciachini-Comasina) opened in early 2011.

Route
The line, 16.6-kilometre long with 21 stations, runs from Comasina to San Donato, entirely underground

Rolling stock

As of 2020, there are two types of trains running on the line:

The 8000 Series, built between 1989 and 2003 and the 900 Series "Meneghino", introduced in 2011 for the line's extension to Comasina.

The 8000 Series has three subseries:

- "standard" 8000 Series, built by a consortium of Breda, Fiat Ferroviaria and OMS, with GTO–VVVF inverters made by ABB.

- 8080 Series, built by Socimi, with GTO–VVVF inverters made by Hitachi.

- 8100 Series, air-conditioned, walk-through version of the older 8000s introduced in 2003 for the line's extension to Machiachini.

Planned extension
A south extension of the line is planned. The new section will run from San Donato through the municipalities of San Donato Milanese, Peschiera Borromeo, Mediglia, Pantigliate, Settala and Paullo.

Although the project was approved in 2010, it was put on hold at the beginning of 2011 due to lack of funds. Works were planned to start in a future year.

Notes and references

External links
Official ATM website
Milan Metro Map

3
Railway lines opened in 1990